{{DISPLAYTITLE:C18H20N2O6}}
The molecular formula C18H20N2O6 (molar mass: 360.36 g/mol, exact mass: 360.1321 u) may refer to:

 CI-1017
 EDDHA
 Nitrendipine
 Sterculinine
 Dityrosine

Molecular formulas